The Joshua K. Hutchison House, also known as the Elcan House, in Brownsville, Tennessee, was built in 1868. It was listed on the National Register of Historic Places on July 7, 1988.

It is a two-story brick masonry building with a rear ell in a commanding position over the intersection of North Church Street and East College Street. It was built for Joshua Kelly Hutchison (1839-1903), a cotton businessman and local politician, and his wife, Isabella Seymour Hutchison (1841-1909). It has a "finely proportioned portico" and has "fine ornamental plaster work" in its interior. Its design combines elements of Greek Revival and Italianate architecture.

References

National Register of Historic Places in Tennessee
Greek Revival architecture in Tennessee
Italianate architecture in Tennessee
Houses in Haywood County, Tennessee
Houses completed in 1868